The 1950 UCI Track Cycling World Championships were the World Championship for track cycling. They took place in Rocourt, Belgium in 1950. Five events for men were contested, three for professionals and two for amateurs.

Medal summary

Medal table

See also
 1950 UCI Road World Championships

References

Track cycling
UCI Track Cycling World Championships by year
International cycle races hosted by Belgium
Sport in Liège
1950 in track cycling